Murdo MacKenzie Fraser (born 5 September 1965) is a Scottish politician who served as Deputy Leader of the Scottish Conservative Party from 2005 to 2011. He has been a Member of the Scottish Parliament (MSP) for the Mid Scotland and Fife region since 2001. Since May 2021, he has served  as Shadow Cabinet Secretary for Covid Recovery, shadowing Deputy First Minister John Swinney.

Early life
Born in 1965, Fraser was educated at Inverness Royal Academy. He studied law at the University of Aberdeen, and was chairman of the Scottish Young Conservatives from 1989 to 1992. During this time, he said he had "appropriated" a plaque marking a TV lounge that had been named to honour Nelson Mandela, as a prank to annoy left-wing students. In 2016, Fraser said he returned the engraved "trophy" to students, although Aberdeen University Student Association disputes the claim.

After undertaking a postgraduate Diploma in Legal Studies, he worked as a solicitor in Aberdeen and Edinburgh, latterly as an associate with Ketchen and Stevens WS in Edinburgh, specialising in commercial law.

Political career
At the 1999 Scottish Parliament election, Fraser was an unsuccessful candidate for North Tayside, as he was in 2003 and 2007. He stood unsuccessfully for the House of Commons at the 1997 general election in East Lothian and at the 2001 general election in North Tayside.

Fraser became an MSP in 2001, after the resignation of Nick Johnston, as next name on the Conservative Party's Mid Scotland and Fife list. He gained a list seat in 2003, 2007, 2011, 2016 and 2021, having lost to John Swinney on each occasion in the constituency vote. Previously the convenor of the Economy, Energy, and Tourism Committee, Fraser is a member of the Finance Committee of the Scottish Parliament.

He became deputy leader of the Scottish Conservatives in November 2005 when Annabel Goldie became leader. After the 2011 election, at which 15 Conservative MSPs were elected, Annabel Goldie triggered a leadership election by announcing that she would stand down in Autumn 2011.

In June 2014, Fraser spoke in favour of reconstituting the United Kingdom on a federal basis.

Party leadership election 
After being elected through the party list in 2011, he announced in August his decision to seek the leadership of the Scottish Conservative Party, and launched his campaign on 4 September in Edinburgh. His launch plans included a commitment to further devolution to the Scottish Parliament from Westminster, as well as launching a new party to redefine the politics of Scotland, harnessing the support of the centre-right, but independent of the UK Conservative Party and with a new name and identity. Fraser was unsuccessful in his attempt to be elected party leader, losing out to Ruth Davidson, and following the election was succeeded as deputy leader by Jackson Carlaw.

Personal life
Fraser lives with his wife and two children in Perthshire. He is a fan of Rangers Football Club.

References

External links
Personal website
 
Murdo Fraser MSP profile at Scottish Conservative Party
Murdo Fraser MSP profile at the site of the Conservative Party

1965 births
Living people
People from Inverness
People educated at Inverness Royal Academy
Alumni of the University of Aberdeen
Scottish solicitors
Conservative MSPs
Members of the Scottish Parliament 2003–2007
Members of the Scottish Parliament 1999–2003
Members of the Scottish Parliament 2007–2011
Members of the Scottish Parliament 2011–2016
Members of the Scottish Parliament 2016–2021
Members of the Scottish Parliament 2021–2026